Minerva Bath Rowing Club is a rowing club in Bath, England

The club
The club was founded in 1914 as Bath Ladies Boat Club (BLBC).  It is one of the earliest women's rowing clubs in England and had strong links with the suffragette movement in the city. This association is still represented with the club's colours of violet and gold. In 1992 it merged with City of Bath Rowing Club to bring the club into its present form.

Minerva Bath Rowing gained a great deal of positive publicity during the London 2012 Olympic Games when Helen Glover; a product of the British Rowing START program who learnt to row at Minerva won a gold medal with Heather Stanning in the Women's Coxless Pairs at Eton Dorney.  Other rowers through the START program include Vicky Thornley who won a silver medal at the 2016 Olympic Games. Minerva also counts among its active members Olympians Arnold Cooke who competed at Tokyo 1964 and Klaus Riekemann who competed at Rome 1960.  They are still rowing and have competed in the World Masters in 2012. Minerva is Sport England Clubmark accredited which means it has demonstrated awareness of child protection and safety, along with providing quality coaching, equal opportunities and good management. The club is also a participant in the Mentoring Plus, a youth crime prevention project working with vulnerable young people, living in Bath and North East Somerset.

Location
Minerva Bath is based in Newbridge, Bath in Bath, Somerset, England with its home water on the River Avon.
The club moved to its present site in 2005, putting in place a boathouse built entirely by its membership.  A second boathouse was built in 2010 and named after Arnold Cooke. The club shares its facilities with the University of Bath Boat Club and the British Rowing START Program.

Notable members
Notable members include:

 Helen Glover
 Arnold Cooke
 Klaus Riekemann

Honours

National champions

Henley Royal Regatta

References

1914 establishments in England
Sports clubs established in 1914
History of rowing
Boathouses in the United Kingdom
Clubs and societies in Somerset
Sport in Bath, Somerset
Rowing clubs of the River Avon